Serenity is the third album by power metal band Kotipelto, released in 2007 while Stratovarius was in hiatus.

Track listing 
All lyrics/music by Timo Kotipelto, except track 2 and 10 (music: Kotipelto/Tuomas Wäinölä).
"Once upon a Time" – 3:21
"Sleep Well" – 4:16
"Serenity" – 3:32
"City of Mysteries" – 4:20
"King Anti-Midas" – 4:06
"Angels Will Cry" – 3:57
"After The Rain" – 3:54
"Mr. Know-It-All" – 5:19
"Dreams and Reality" – 4:27
"Last Defender" – 8:17
"After the Rain" (Acoustic Version) [limited edition bonus track] – 3:45
"Sleep Well" (Acoustic Version) [Japanese edition bonus track] – 3:55
"Serenity" (Acoustic version) [Japanese edition bonus track] – 3:45

Personnel 
Timo Kotipelto – vocals
Tuomas Wäinölä – guitar
Lauri Porra – bass
Janne Wirman – keyboards
Mirka Rantanen – drums

Production
Mixed by Mikko Karmila at Finnvox Studios
Mastered by Mika Jussila at Finnvox Studios
Drums and guitars recorded at Sonic Pump Studios – engineered by Nino Laurenne
Guitar solos, bass and vocals recorded at High And Loud's Elk-studios – engineered by Tero "mix-max" Kostermaa
Backing vocals by Brothers of Balls: Pasi Rantanen, Anssi Stenberg and Marko Waara
Cover artwork and layout by Janne "ToxicAngel" Pitkänen

Chart performance

References 

2007 albums
AFM Records albums
Kotipelto albums